Shahsavari (also Romanized as Shahsavārī; also known as Shahsavār, Shāhsuvār, and Shakhsuvar) is a village in Bedevostan-e Gharbi Rural District, Khvajeh District, Heris County, East Azerbaijan Province, Iran. At the 2006 census, its population was 467, in 106 families.

References 

Populated places in Heris County